Chaulā (Nepal Bhasa: चौला) is the sixth month in the Nepal Era calendar, the national lunar calendar of Nepal. The month coincides with Chaitra (चैत्र) in the Hindu lunar calendar and April in the Gregorian calendar.

Chaulā begins with the new moon and the full moon falls on the 15th of the lunar month. The month is divided into the bright and dark fortnights which are known as Chaulā Thaw (चौला थ्व) and Chaulā Gā (चौला गा) respectively.

One of the major events that occur during this month is Jana Baha Dyah Jatra, the chariot festival of the Buddhist deity White Machhendranath, the Bodhisattva of compassion. It begins on the 8th day of the bright fortnight and ends on the 10th day.

The Hindu festival of Chaitra Dasain also falls on the 8th day of the bright fortnight. It is a smaller version of the Dasain festival. The 9th day is Rama Navami which celebrates the birth of the Hindu deity Rama.

The full moon day is known as Bālāju Purnimā or Lhuti Punhi. In Kathmandu, people celebrate the holiday by bathing at the stone water spouts of Balaju and climbing the nearby sacred hilltop of Jamacho. The 15th day of the dark fortnight is Nepalese Mother's Day, known as Mātā Tirtha Aunsi ("Mother Pilgrimage New Moon") or Māmyā Khwā Swayegu ("Looking upon Mother's Face").

Days in the month

Months of the year

References

Months
Nepali calendar
Nepalese culture